Camminghabuurstermolen was a smock mill in Leeuwarden, Friesland, Netherlands which was built in 1850. The restored mill was burnt out in an arson attack in 1994, and the remains were finally demolished in 2000.

History

The Camminghabuurstermolen was built in 1850. In 1943, the mill was equipped with Patent sails of  span. The mill worked by wind until 1947 when a  electric motor driving an Appold turbine replaced the Archimedes' screw. The mill then became derelict, but was bought for ƒ5 by the Gemeente Leeuwarden in 1958. It was restored by millwright de Roos of Leeuwarden. The sails were removed in the early 1990s. On 11 May 1994, the mill was subject to an arson attack and was burnt out. The cost of restoring the mill was estimated at between 5 and 10 million Guilders. The windshaft and brake wheel had been removed by 1998. The mill was demolished in 2000. Parts from this mill were used in the restoration of the Slagdijkstermolen, Finkum. The windshaft was used in the restoration of De Babuurstermolen, Tjerkwerd.

Description

Camminghabuurstermolen was what the Dutch describe as a Grondzeiler. It was a three-storey smock mill on a low brick base. There was no stage, the sails reaching almost to ground level. The mill was winded by tailpole and winch. The smock and cap are thatched. Post-restoration, the sails were Common sails. The sails were carried on a cast-iron windshaft which was cast by H J Koning of Foxham, Groningen and probably dating from 1914. The windshaft also carried the brake wheel, which drove the wallower at  the top of the upright shaft. At the bottom of the upright shaft the crown wheel drove a gearwheel on the axle of the Archimedes' screw. The Archimedes' screw was  diameter.

Millmen
Tjitzje D Jonker 1850-96
Sjoerd Jonker 1896-1941
Tjisse Jonker 1941-47

Reference for above:-

References

Windmills in Friesland
Windmills completed in 1850
Smock mills in the Netherlands
Windpumps in the Netherlands
Octagonal buildings in the Netherlands
Demolished buildings and structures in the Netherlands
Buildings and structures demolished in 2000